Actinopus buritiensis is a species of mygalomorph spider in the family Actinopodidae. It can be found in Brazil.

The specific name refers to the municipality of Buriti, Maranhão, Brazil.

References 

buritiensis
Spiders described in 2020